Meet the Parents is a 1992 American independent comedy film written by Greg Glienna and Mary Ruth Clarke. Glienna also directed and starred in the film as the main protagonist, Greg: a young man meeting his fiancée's parents for the first time who sets off a series of accidents and causes the family to fall apart.

Filmed on a budget of approximately $100,000 and shot in and around Chicago, Meet the Parents was not widely distributed and did not earn a large profit at the box office upon its limited release. It did, however, garner some critical acclaim and film industry attention towards remaking the film on a bigger budget.

Several years after the film's release, Universal Pictures purchased the rights to the independent film. After hiring screenwriter Jim Herzfeld to expand the script, a new version of Meet the Parents was filmed and released in October 2000. The 2000 version in turn inspired two movie sequels
and two television series.

Plot
A man and his fiancée on their way to meet her parents stop to get gas at a gas station. The man mentions his plans to the owner, who advises him against it. He tells the tale of Greg, an advertising agent who traveled with his fiancée Pam to meet her parents for a weekend that ended disastrously.

Despite his efforts to impress Pam's parents, Irv and Kay, Greg sets off a number of mishaps. He breaks their Victrola, overflows the toilet, ruins Kay's roast, rents a seemingly family friendly VCR with gratuitous violence and sex, nearly stabs Kay’s eye with a fishing pole, gets framed for marijuana planted in his luggage, collides with a hit-and-run driver while in the family's car, drowns their dog Bingo in a lake, and escapes a bar brawl with Pam's ex-boyfriend Lee. Throughout the visit, Pam's sister Fay, an aspiring singer, insists Greg hear her Star Search audition since she mistakenly thinks he has ties with Ed McMahon, who appeared in a commercial Greg wrote. On the second night, Greg enters her bedroom in searching for Pam's.

Near the end of the visit, Greg's car breaks down. He plans to flee the house with Pam, who urges him to stay one more night. He then unintentionally causes a portrait of Irv's late mother Penny to fall on an urn containing her ashes. With no reputation left to lose, Greg listens to Fay sing a ballad entitled "When Philip's There". She begs him for suggestions, and he reluctantly gives slight criticism, leaving her furious. Fay then tells her family Greg entered her bedroom the previous night but claims he wanted to cheat on Pam with her. Distraught, Pam hides in her room, forcing Greg to leave alone. As he approaches the front door, he and Pam's parents hear her scream from upstairs. Irv discovers Fay has hanged herself with a sign reading "Greg killed me" around her neck, rushes downstairs, and fires his gun.

When asked if Irv killed Greg, the gas station owner explains that Irv accidentally killed Kay and Pam, then died of a heart attack, while Greg turned out fine. The customer leaves, now uneasy about meeting his fiancée's parents. Another customer arrives on his way to take his children to a circus, and the owner advises him against it, beginning a new story.

Cast
 John Da Cosse as First Customer
 Karen Ann Gronowski as Fiancée
 Jim Vincent as Gas Station Owner
 Greg Glienna as Greg
 Jacqueline Cahill as Pam Burns
 Dick Galloway as Irv Burns
 Carol Whelan as Kay Burns
 Mary Ruth Clarke as Fay Burns
 Emo Philips as Video Store Employee
 Domenic Sfreddo as Hit & Run Driver
 Harry Hickstein as Lee
 Mike Toomey as Priest
 Marc Vann as Second Customer

Reception

Film critic Suzan Ayscough reviewed the film for Variety magazine in 1992. In her review, she called the film a "wonderfully twisted black comedy" even though she believed it to be "excessive and occasionally overdone". Ayscough predicted that the film "could garner a cult following among anti-establishment urbanites" due to its "blatant attack on marriage, suburban indifference, Christian hypocrisy and the nuclear family" and unsuitability for mainstream audiences. Opining that the "script desperately needed an objective eye", she concluded by calling the film an "amusing vehicle which aptly displays the multiple talents of Greg Glienna".

Film producer Elliot Grove, founder of Raindance Film Festival and the British Independent Film Awards, listed the original Meet the Parents on his personal Top Ten list of favorite films. In the article, he called it "much funnier and tighter than the Hollywood version".

Film critic Jonathan Rosenbaum liked the film and was tempted to call it, "the ultimate worst-case-scenario comedy". He said it "may not always make you laugh but will impress you with the singularity of Glienna’s dark approach". He also added that the audience was "still likely to be taken by the purity and relentlessness of this picture's vision".

Remake

Producer Nancy Tenenbaum acquired the rights to the original film and then she sent a copy to several people of interest hoping to have a new version of the film made. Filmmaker Steven Soderbergh replied that he was interested and that he wanted to direct a remake. He brought it to the attention of Universal Studios who initially declined but subsequently optioned the rights to the film in 1995. Sodebergh took on the project but then dropped it when he got involved with Out of Sight.

In 1995 Universal Studios purchased the rights to the film. The screenplay was expanded by screenwriter Jim Herzfeld and film director Jay Roach was hired to direct the 2000 version of Meet the Parents with Ben Stiller and Robert De Niro in the leading roles. Distributed by Universal Studios domestically and by United International Pictures internationally, the remade film was a big financial success earning $166.2 million in the United States and a total of $330.4 million worldwide.

The 2000 version in turn inspired two movie sequels, Meet the Fockers (2004) and Little Fockers (2010).

See also
 Cinema of the United States
 List of American films of 1992

References

External links
 
 PBS Wisconsin's Director's Cut episode on Greg Glienna - "Meet the Parents"

1992 films
1992 comedy films
American comedy films
Films set in Chicago
Films shot in Chicago
1992 directorial debut films
1990s English-language films
1990s American films